Dave Pomeroy (born April 26, 1956) is an American musician, known as a Nashville vocalist, songwriter, and producer (Earwave Productions), but is best known as a bassist. He has played electric and acoustic bass for many world renowned artists, both in the studio and in concert. As a solo artist and producer, he has released 12 albums and 2 DVDs on his own label, Earwave Music. He has written numerous articles and columns for Bass Player magazine and other music publications and has contributed as a writer to a number of books about the music business.

In December 2008, Pomeroy was elected as president of the Nashville Musicians Association, AFM Local 257 of the American Federation of Musicians (AFM) and in June 2010, he was also elected to the AFM's International Executive Board and was re-elected in 2013, 2016, and 2019. Pomeroy has been re-elected without opposition to four more 3-year terms as Local 257 president in November 2011, 2014, 2017 and 2020.

Biography 
Pomeroy was born in Italy, the son of an American soldier, and spent his childhood and youth in various places. He credits a four-year-long stay in England in the early 1960s as an early musical influence and returned to the country in the mid-70s, when he moved to London to play in numerous local bands. In 1977, Pomeroy settled in Nashville. He was hired by rockabilly musician Sleepy LaBeef within a couple of weeks and went on tour with him for a year. In 1980 he joined Don Williams' touring band and stayed with him until 1994, when he stopped touring to concentrate on studio work, writing, and producing in Nashville. He founded his own record label Earwave Music in 1989 and has released 12 CDs and 2 DVDs, available at www.davepomeroy.com. He returned to Williams' band for his comeback tour in September/October 2010 and occasionally filled in with Williams through the end of 2014 .

As a session musician Pomeroy contributed to albums not only by Williams and LaBeef, but also by such diverse artists as Trisha Yearwood, Emmylou Harris, Guy Clark, Peter Frampton, Duane Eddy,Neil Diamond, Billy Ray Cyrus, Tom Paxton, George Jones, Billy Joe Shaver, Shelby Lynne, Jon Randall, Brenda Lee, Gretchen Peters, Alan Jackson, Beth Nielsen Chapman, Earl Scruggs, Randy Scruggs, Allison Moorer, Steve Wariner, Asleep at the Wheel, Matraca Berg, Kathy Mattea, Larry Knechtel, Keith Whitley, Jesse Winchester, and Alison Krauss. He is a featured artist on the "Nashville Acoustic Sessions" CD project, with Raul Malo, Rob Ickes, and Pat Flynn, released by CMH Records in 2004.
In addition to his long tenure with Don Williams, Pomeroy has performed in concert with artists such as Steve Winwood, Willie Nelson, Garth Brooks, John Hiatt, Ricky Skaggs, Adrian Belew, Peter Frampton, Lee Ann Womack, Patty Loveless, Reeves Gabrels, Duane Eddy, and many more.

Pomeroy's record label, Earwave Music, has released 12 albums and 2 DVDs of his various projects as solo artist, bandleader, and producer. In the 1990s, he created The All-Bass Orchestra, with personnel ranging from 12 to 22 bassists playing the roles of an entire ensemble. The concert video "The Day The Bass Players Took Over The World", (originally released in 1996 on VHS on Earwave, and re-released on DVD in 2014 with bonus material) featuring special guests Victor Wooten, Steve Bailey, Oteil Burbridge, and Bill Dickens. This unique multi-bass player live project brought attention to Pomeroy's concept of "all-bass music" as demonstrated on his three all-bass and vocal solo projects "Basses Loaded" (1997) "Tomorrow Never Knows" (2003) and "Angel in the Ashes" (2017). He has written more than 50 articles for Bass Player magazine and has contributed to a number of books about music, including writing the forward for Jim Robert's book "American Basses".

Among his most recent projects are Three Ring Circle, an "acoustic jam band powergrass trio" with Rob Ickes and Andy Leftwich, and The Taproom Tapes, a live recording of collective improvisations featuring 14 of Nashville's musicians, including Jeff Coffin, Pat Bergeson, Johnny Neel, and others. Three Ring Circle's second CD, Brothership, was released on ResoRevolution Records in April 2011. He produced Restless, the first album of new material by Sweethearts of the Rodeo in over ten years, released in 2012. His third solo album, Angel in the Ashes, was released in 2017 to positive reviews.

Pomeroy has been active in the Nashville community, raising over $495,000 for Nashville's Room in the Inn Homeless program with his annual "Nashville Unlimited Christmas" concerts over the past 22 years. Over the years, Pomeroy has become more and more involved in the musicians union as an advocate for working musicians. In December 2008, he was elected president of the Nashville-based Local 257 of the American Federation of Musicians, succeeding longtime president Harold Bradley. In June 2010, he was also elected to the International Executive Board of the AFM for a three-year term and re-elected in 2013 and 2016. In November 2011, Pomeroy was re-elected without opposition to a second three-year term as President of Local 257 and again in 2014, 2017, and 2020. He was one of the AFM leaders in the forefront of the effort to reform airline carry on policies for musical instruments, a process completed in December 2014. In addition to his AFM responsibilities, Pomeroy continues to record, write and perform in a variety of musical settings, and his latest release is the single "World Peace" co-written and performed with Regina McCrary.

Discography

Recordings under his own name or as part of a group:
Dave Pomeroy "Angel in the Ashes" released May 2017
Dave Pomeroy and the All-Bass Orchestra: "The Day The Bass Players Took Over The World" concert DVD with guests     Victor Wooten, Steve Bailey, Oteil Burbridge, Bill Dickens, Duane Eddy, Bob Babbitt (Earwave) 
Tone Patrol: Thin Air (Earwave), with guests Sam Bush, Bill Miller and Wayne Roland Brown
Dave Pomeroy: Basses Loaded (Earwave)
Dave Pomeroy: Tomorrow Never Knows (Earwave)
Three Ring Circle: Three Ring Circle (Earwave), with Rob Ickes and Andy Leftwich (Earwave)
Dave Pomeroy And Friends: The Taproom Tapes (Earwave)
Three Ring Circle: "Brothership" with Rob Ickes and Andy Leftwich (ResoRevolution)

Pomeroy's producer credits include:
Don Williams – Best of Live (co-producer) 
Sleepy LaBeef – "Rides Again" DVD and CD (Earwave)
Sweethearts of The Rodeo – "Restless" 
Jamie Hartford Band - "Stuff That Works" (Earwave)
Supercool – "Greatest Hits, Vol. 1" (Earwave)

For a comprehensive list of session contributions see [ Pomeroy's credits at Allmusic].

References

External links 
 
 Three Ring Circle
 AFM Local 257
 [ Dave Pomeroy] at Allmusic
Dave Pomeroy NAMM Oral History Program Interview (2015)

Living people
American country bass guitarists
American country songwriters
American male songwriters
1956 births
Musicians from Nashville, Tennessee
Songwriters from Tennessee
Guitarists from Tennessee
American male bass guitarists
20th-century American bass guitarists
Country musicians from Tennessee
20th-century American male musicians